D.A.C. Records is an American record label belonging to David Allan Coe.

List of Albums
David Allan Coe - Nothing Sacred (1978)
David Allan Coe - Underground Album (1982)

External links
 David Allan Coe Records

See also
 List of record labels

American record labels